Christina Fischer is a female former international table tennis player from Germany.

Table tennis career
She won a bronze medal for Germany at the 1997 World Table Tennis Championships in the Corbillon Cup (women's team event) with Olga Nemeș, Elke Schall, Jie Schöpp and Nicole Struse.

She also won three European Table Tennis Championships medals including two golds.

See also
 List of World Table Tennis Championships medalists

References

German female table tennis players
Living people
World Table Tennis Championships medalists
Year of birth missing (living people)